The 2015 Hofstra Pride softball team represented Hofstra University in the 2015 NCAA Division I softball season. The Pride competed in the Colonial Athletic Association and were led by first-year head coach Larissa Anderson. Hofstra played its home games at the Hofstra Softball Stadium in Hempstead, New York. Head coach and NFCA Hall of Fame member Bill Edwards retired after the 2014 season, and chose associate head coach Larissa Anderson to be his successor. On April 19, 2015, the stadium was renamed in his honor.

Roster

Schedule

! style="background:#16007C;color:#FFAD00"| Regular Season
|- valign="top" 

|- align="center" bgcolor="#ffccc"
| 1 || February 13 ||  || Tiger Park (LSU) || 2–3 || 0–1 || –
|- align="center" bgcolor="#ffccc"
| 2 || February 13 || Louisiana State || Tiger Park (LSU) || 0–3 || 0–2 || –
|- bgcolor="#ccffcc"
| 3 || February 14 ||  || Tiger Park (LSU) || 8–0 || 1–2 || –
|- align="center" bgcolor="#ffccc"
| 4 || February 14 || Louisiana State || Tiger Park (LSU) || 0–8 || 1–3 || –
|- bgcolor="#ccffcc"
| 5 || February 15 || Notre Dame || Tiger Park (LSU) || 3–2 || 2–3 || –
|- bgcolor="#ccffcc"
| 6 || February 20 ||  || Lafayette, LA || 4–3 || 3–3 || –
|- align="center" bgcolor="#ffccc"
| 7 || February 20 ||  || Lafayette, LA || 0–3 || 3–4 || –
|- bgcolor="#ccffcc"
| 8 || February 21 ||  || Lafayette, LA || 9–3 || 4–4 || –
|- align="center" bgcolor="#ffccc"
| 9 || February 21 ||  || Lafayette, LA || 0–9 ||4–5 || –
|- bgcolor="#ccffcc"
| 10 || February 22 ||  || Lafayette, LA|| 3–2 || 5–5 || –
|- bgcolor="#FFFFFF"

|- bgcolor="#ccffcc"
| 11 || March 6 || BCU || Boca Raton, FL || 6–1 || 6–5 || –
|- align="center" bgcolor="#ffccc"
| 12 || March 6 || FAU || Boca Raton, FL || 2–3 || 6–6 || –
|- bgcolor="#ccffcc"
| 13 || March 7 || CCU || Boca Raton, FL || 2–0 || 7–6 || –
|- align="center" bgcolor="#ffccc"
| 14 || March 7 || FSU || Boca Raton, FL || 1–2 || 7–7 || –
|- bgcolor="#FFFFFF"
| 15 || March 8 || FAU || Boca Raton, FL || 5–5 || 7–7–1 || –
|- bgcolor="#ccffcc"
| 16 || March 18 ||  || Bronx, NY || 1–0 || 8–7–1 || –
|- bgcolor="#ccffcc"
| 17 || March 21 ||  || Wilmington, NC || 8–0 || 9–7–1 || 1–0
|- bgcolor="#ccffcc"
| 18 || March 21 ||  || Wilmington, NC || 3–0 || 10–7–1 || 2–0
|- bgcolor="#ccffcc"
| 19 || March 22 ||  || Wilmington, NC || 6–0 || 11–7–1 || 3–0
|- bgcolor="#ccffcc"
| 20 || March 24 ||  || Hofstra Softball Stadium || 6–5 || 12–7–1 || 3–0
|- bgcolor="#FFFFFF"
| 21 || March 25 ||  || Hofstra Softball Stadium || CLD || – || –
|- bgcolor="#FFFFFF"
| 22 || March 25 ||  || Hofstra Softball Stadium || CLD || – || –
|- bgcolor="#ccffcc"
| 23 || March 28 ||  || Hofstra Softball Stadium || 7–3 || 13–7–1 || 4–0
|- bgcolor="#ccffcc"
| 24 || March 28 ||  || Hofstra Softball Stadium || 14–6 || 14–7–1 || 5–0
|- bgcolor="#ccffcc"
| 25 || March 29 ||  || Hofstra Softball Stadium || 6–4 || 15–7–1 || 6–0
|- align="center" bgcolor="##FFFFFF"

|- bgcolor="#ccffcc"
| 26 || April 1 ||  || Hofstra Softball Stadium || 15–0 || 16–7–1 || 6–0
|- bgcolor="#ccffcc"
| 27 || April 1 ||  || Hofstra Softball Stadium || 16–1 || 17–7–1 || 6–0
|- align="center" bgcolor="#ffccc"
| 28 || April 4 ||  || Hofstra Softball Stadium || 2–4 || 17–8–1 || 6–1
|- align="center" bgcolor="#ffccc"
| 29 || April 4 ||  || Hofstra Softball Stadium || 4–7 || 17–9–1 || 6–2
|- bgcolor="#FFFFFF"
| 30 || April 4 ||  || Hofstra Softball Stadium || CLD || – || –
|- bgcolor="#ccffcc"
| 31 || April 8 ||  || Bethlehem, PA || 5–4 || 18–9–1 || 6–2
|- bgcolor="#ccffcc"
| 32 || April 8 ||  || Bethlehem, PA || 4–0 || 19–9–1 || 6–2
|- bgcolor="#ccffcc"
| 33 || April 11 ||  || Philadelphia, PA || 4–3 || 20–9–1 || 7–2
|- bgcolor="#ccffcc"
| 34 || April 11 ||  || Philadelphia, PA || 11–1 || 21–9–1 || 8–2
|- bgcolor="#ccffcc"
| 35 || April 12 ||  || Philadelphia, PA || 10–1 || 22–9–1 || 9–2
|- bgcolor="#ccffcc"
| 36 || April 15 ||  || Hofstra Softball Stadium || 8–0 || 23–9–1 || 9–2
|- align="center" bgcolor="#ffccc"
| 37 || April 16 ||  || Hofstra Softball Stadium || 0–4 || 23–10–1 || 9–2
|- bgcolor="#ccffcc"
| 38 || April 18 ||  || Hofstra Softball Stadium || 4–1 || 24–10–1 || 10–2
|- bgcolor="#ccffcc"
| 39 || April 18 ||  || Hofstra Softball Stadium || 4–0 || 25–10–1 || 11–2
|- align="center" bgcolor="#ffccc"
| 40 || April 19 ||  || Bill Edwards Stadium || 2–5 || 25–11–1 || 11–3
|- bgcolor="#ccffcc"
| 41 || April 21 ||  || Bill Edwards Stadium || 6–4 || 26–11–1 || 11–3
|- bgcolor="#FFFFFF"
|- align="center" bgcolor="#FFFFFF"
| 42 || April 21 ||  || Bill Edwards Stadium || CLD || – || –
|- bgcolor="#FFFFFF"
|- align="center" bgcolor="#ccffcc"
| 43 || April 22 ||  ||  Stadium || 7–1 || 27–11–1 || 11–3
|- bgcolor="#ccffcc"
| 44 || April 25 ||  || Bill Edwards Stadium || 8–0 || 28–11–1 || 12–3
|- bgcolor="#ccffcc"
| 45 || April 25 ||  || Bill Edwards Stadium || 8–0 || 29–11–1 || 13–3
|- bgcolor="#ccffcc"
| 46 || April 26 ||  || Bill Edwards Stadium || 3–0 || 30–11–1 || 14–3
|- bgcolor="#ccffcc"
| 47 || April 28 ||  || South Orange, NJ || 6–3 || 31–11–1 || 14–3
|- bgcolor="#FFFFFF"

|- bgcolor="#ccffcc"
| 48 || May 1 ||  || Charleston, SC || 12–2 || 32–11–1 || 15–3
|- bgcolor="#ccffcc"
| 49 || May 1 ||  || Charleston, SC || 8–0 ||33–11–1 || 16–3
|- bgcolor="#ccffcc"
| 50 || May 2 ||  || Charleston, SC || 11–5 || 34–11–1 || 17–3
|- bgcolor="#FFFFFF"

|- bgcolor="#ccffcc"
| 51 || May 6 || Elon || Harrisonburg, VA || 10–0 || 35–11–1 || 17–3
|- bgcolor="#ccffcc"
| 52 || May 7 || James Madison || Harrisonburg, VA || 5–3 || 36–11–1 || 17–3
|- align="center" bgcolor="#ffccc"
| 53 || May 8 || James Madison || Harrisonburg, VA || 3–4 || 36–12–1 || 17–3
|- bgcolor="#ccffcc"
| 54 || May 8 || James Madison || Harrisonburg, VA || 2–1 || 37–12–1 || 17–3
|-

|

References

Hofstra Pride softball seasons
Hofstra
Hofstra